Paul Annacone and Christo van Rensburg were the defending champions but lost in the semifinals to John Fitzgerald and Anders Järryd.

Fitzgerald and Järryd won in the final 7–6, 6–1, 7–5 against Ken Flach and Robert Seguso.

Seeds

Draw

Finals

Top half

Section 1

Section 2

Bottom half

Section 3

Section 4

External links
1988 Lipton International Players Championships Doubles Draw

Men's Doubles